The 2001 NCAA Division I Cross Country Championships were the 63rd annual NCAA Men's Division I Cross Country Championship and the 21st annual NCAA Women's Division I Cross Country Championship to determine the team and individual national champions of NCAA Division I men's and women's collegiate cross country running in the United States. In all, four different titles were contested: men's and women's individual and team championships.

Held on November 19, 2001, the combined meet was hosted by Furman University in Greenville, South Carolina. The distance for the men's race was 10 kilometers (6.21 miles) while the distance for the women's race was 6 kilometers (3.73 miles) for the first time, 1,000 meets longer than in previous years. 

The men's team championship was won by Colorado (90 points), the Buffaloes' first. The women's team championship was won by BYU (62 points), the Cougars' third overall (and third in five years). 

The two individual champions were, for the men, Boaz Cheboiywo (Eastern Michigan, 28:47) and, for the women, Tara Chaplin (Arizona, 20:24).

Men's title
Distance: 10,000 meters

Men's Team Result (Top 10)

Men's Individual Result (Top 10)

Women's title
Distance: 6,000 meters

Women's Team Result (Top 10)

Women's Individual Result (Top 10)

References
 

NCAA Cross Country Championships
NCAA Division I Cross Country Championships
NCAA Division I Cross Country Championships
NCAA Division I Cross Country Championships
Sports in Greenville, South Carolina
Track and field in South Carolina
Furman University